Kwania District  is a district in Northern Uganda. It was formed from the Apac District sub-counties Chawente, Abongomola, Nambyeiso, Inomo, Aduku; and Aduku town council. The other subcounties are Ayabi, Ayabi town council, Akali, Atongtidi and Inomo town council, totalling to 11 subcounties. 

The current district chairperson from the recently conluded January 2021 elections is hon Ogwal Geoffrey Alex. He assumes office on 20 May 2021. The outgoing interim chairperson is Okello Onac.

References

Districts of Uganda
Lango sub-region